The men's 50 metre rifle, prone was a shooting sports event held as part of the Shooting at the 1936 Summer Olympics programme. It was the fifth appearance of the event. The competition was held on 8 August 1936 at the shooting ranges at Wannsee. 66 shooters from 25 nations competed.

Medalists

Records
These were the standing world and Olympic records prior to the 1936 Summer Olympics.

There was no official world record registered.

(*) Olympic record according to the conditions of this Games - 300 rings possible

(**) 400 rings possible

Results

Starting order: The competitors were divided into three groups after draw.

Starting times: First group 8.30 to 10.30 a.m., second group 11 a.m. to 1 p.m., and third group 3 to 5 p.m.

Weather: The first group started to shoot in the rain. But the rain stopped after half an hour. The overcast sky cleared up in the afternoon and brought occasional sunshine. The wind refreshed in the afternoon and disturbed occasionally.

The competition was held over 15 series of two shots, so every shooter had 30 shots. The maximum score was 300.

Willy Røgeberg won the contest with the maximum of 300 and set a new Olympic record. 12 shooters finished with a better score than the standing Olympic record prior the Games.

The places two to seven were established by comparison of the hits on target.

References

External links
Official Report Part II
 

Shooting at the 1936 Summer Olympics
Men's 050m prone 1936